is a former Japanese football player.

Playing career
Sahara was born in Yokohama on May 15, 1978. After graduating from high school, he joined Japan Football League club Kawasaki Frontale in 1997. He debuted and played many matches in 1998 and the club was promoted to new league J2 League from 1999. In 1999, he became a regular player as center back of three backs defense with Tetsuo Nakanishi and Takumi Morikawa. The club also won the champions and was promoted to J1 League from 2000. In early 2000, although he played as regular player, he got hurt and could not play at all in the match for about 2 seasons. The club was also relegated to J2 from 2001. Although he came back in 2002, he could not play many matches behind Hiroki Ito, Yoshinobu Minowa and Kazunari Okayama. From 2004, although he was 4th defender behind Ito Minowa and Shuhei Terada, he played many matches and the club won the champions and was promoted to J1 from 2005. In 2007, he moved to FC Tokyo on loan. He played many matches as center back in 2008. Although he could not play many matches for injury in 2009, the club won the champions 2009 J.League Cup by defeating Kawasaki Frontale at Final. In 2010, he returned to Kawasaki Frontale and retired end of 2010 season.

Club statistics

References

External links

1978 births
Living people
Association football people from Kanagawa Prefecture
Japanese footballers
J1 League players
J2 League players
Japan Football League (1992–1998) players
Kawasaki Frontale players
Grêmio Foot-Ball Porto Alegrense players
FC Tokyo players
Association football defenders